Jillian Armenante is an American television and film actress, known for playing the role of Donna Kozlowski on the TV show Judging Amy.

Life and career
Armenante was born in Paterson, New Jersey, and grew up in Wyckoff, New Jersey.
 
Her feature-film credits include Vice, Hail, Caesar!, Bad Teacher, A Mighty Heart, North Country and Girl, Interrupted. On television, Armenante has made guest appearances on several shows including Fresh Off the Boat, The Mayor, Shameless, Medium, Party Down, Castle, The Closer, Private Practice, Grey's Anatomy, Las Vegas, ER, Six Feet Under, The West Wing, and Northern Exposure.

With Alice Dodd, her wife, Armenante co-produced, co-directed and co-wrote Laura Comstock's Bag-Punching Dog and In Flagrante Gothicto at the Circle X Theatre Company. Laura Comstock's Bag-Punching Dog won the Theatre L.A. Ovation Award for "Best New Musical" and "Best Musical Production".

In Flagrante Gothicto received:
 Los Angeles Drama Critics Circle Awards for writing, directing and production 
 The Ted Schmitt Award for "Most Outstanding Debut of a New Play" 
 LA Weekly Theater Award for playwriting and comedy ensemble 
 Back Stage West Garland Awards for production, direction, writing, ensemble and Lead Actress (Alice Dodd) 

In Flagrante Gothicto was produced at The Empty Space Theatre in Seattle in their 2003 season.

Armenante directed the world premiere of Great Men Of Science, Nos. 21 & 22. The show received a Theatre L.A. Ovation Award for "Best Production in a 99 seat theatre", and The L.A. Weekly Award for Best Production. She also produced The Texarkansas Waltz at Circle X Theatre.

Regionally, she has acted at the Empty Space Theatre in the title role of The Salvation Of Iggy Scrooge; at the Group Theatre in Marisol; at New City Theatre in Stript and 3 Americanisms.

She played "Melony" in a stage version of The Cider House Rules which was performed at The Atlantic Theater in New York City, the Seattle Repertory Theatre, and at The Mark Taper Forum in Los Angeles. For this role she was nominated for a Drama Desk Award, received a Garland Award and a Theatre World Award for "Debut on the New York Stage". The show also received a Theatre L.A. Ovation Award for "Best Production in a Larger Theatre".

In Seattle, she was a member of Annex Theatre for eight years, where she appeared in The Fatty Arbuckle Spookhouse Review, Bessemer's Spectacles, Tattoo Girl, and Hamlet The Musical. At Annex, she directed Triplets In Uniform, Exquisite Torture, and Running From Boomerangs. She was the Associate Artistic Director for Alice B. Theatre where she produced Pretty, Witty and Gay and Memory Tricks by Marga Gomez at the Broadway Performance Hall.

Personal life
Armenante is married to actress Alice Dodd. The couple have two daughters: Hazel Georgia Dodd Armenante and Heloise Margaret Armenante Dodd.

Filmography

Film

Television

|2022
|Physical
| woman in recovery
|1 episode
|}

Other work

References

External links

Living people
Actresses from New Jersey
20th-century American dramatists and playwrights
American film actresses
American stage actresses
American television actresses
American theatre directors
Women theatre directors
American theatre managers and producers
American LGBT actors
LGBT people from New Jersey
Actors from Paterson, New Jersey
People from Wyckoff, New Jersey
20th-century American actresses
21st-century American actresses
Theatre World Award winners
Year of birth missing (living people)